"A Soldier's Farewell" is the third episode of the fifth series of the British television sitcom Dad's Army. It was originally transmitted on 20 October 1972.

Synopsis
Mainwaring is depressed: his men are falling short of his expectations, his leadership is unappreciated. He then dreams that he is Napoleon at the Battle of Waterloo.

Plot
The episode opens with the Walmington-on-Sea Home Guard unit in Eastgate cinema.  They are watching the film Conquest about Napoleon, in particular a scene where he says goodbye to Marie Walewska, his mistress. A panning shot moves across the faces of the platoon while they are watching, Mainwaring looking superior, Wilson looking bored, Frazer muttering "rubbish", Pike sucking his thumb, Godfrey asleep, Walker with his arms around a blonde girl, and Jones looking dreamy. After the film ends, "God Save the King" begins playing, but the platoon all stampede out apart from Mainwaring who gets knocked over in the rush but struggles up to stand to attention while the anthem plays to a now empty cinema.

The platoon is next seen on the upper deck of a bus going back to Walmington-on-Sea. Mainwaring asks the platoon what they thought of the film. Sponge says they should have sat at the front as he could not see. Mainwaring says he was disappointed – he thought the film would have been about strategy and tactics but consisted of Greta Garbo being chased around a four poster bed. Walker replies that that is strategy and tactics.

Wilson and Mainwaring are given their tickets by an attractive bus conductress who Mainwaring takes a fancy to. When Walker, Pike and Jones start larking about then singing the ribald song "Roll Me Over in the Clover" Mainwaring stops them and apologises to the bus conductress. She is grateful and says he is "very gallant". Warden Hodges arrives, and teases the platoon for going to the cinema and not being ready for Hitler. Whilst buying a ticket he asks the bus conductress for a "tickle at the terminus". Mainwaring is furious and intervenes again, and is thanked by the bus conductress. He then instructs the platoon that after their disgraceful behaviour in the cinema, they are to let him get off the bus first and in an orderly fashion. When the bus stops at Walmington, Hodges lets him get halfway down the bus then shouts "It's closing time in five minutes", thus causing Mainwaring to get knocked over again in the stampede as the platoon rush for the pub.

Later, the platoon are on parade. Frazer gives a long rambling explanation of how he complained to the manager about the "sheer historical inaccuracies of the film", but eventually admits sheepishly that he got his money back. Mainwaring berates them for the two examples of bad behaviour. They apologise, but he responds by saying that "fine words butter no parsnips". This provokes a discussion in the ranks, about how you cannot get butter or parsnips (with Walker offering to obtain both), until he says that the platoon will have to stand to attention whilst Sergeant Wilson plays the National Anthem on the gramophone six times. They stand to attention, but Wilson plays the German National Anthem "Deutschland Über Alles" by mistake, and is half asleep so Mainwaring has to shout at him to turn it off. He and Wilson go to Mainwaring's office, where they find the vicar at his desk, who refuses to get out of the way for Mainwaring. Whilst Jones continues to play the National Anthem at an increasing speed, Mainwaring and the vicar have to stand, then race to sit on the chair, like musical chairs.

The next scene is in Mainwaring's office after the parade. Walker arrives and gives Sgt Wilson two bottles of Black Market stout, and presents Mainwaring with some similarly sourced cheddar cheese. Mainwaring excuses this to Wilson by saying it is for his vegetarian wife. He rings her to spring this 'toasted cheese supper' surprise on her, but she gets the wrong idea on the phone and says she has a headache and is going to bed. Mainwaring is disappointed, but Wilson suggests they eat the cheese between them. Mainwaring is touched, then Jones arrives and, tempted by the cheese, offers some kidneys if he can join them. Cut to the end of the feast, when Jones tells a wonderful rambling story about a native girl he nearly married in the Sudan. Mainwaring leaves to go home, suggesting that the bus conductress they met earlier would not have turned down a toasted cheese supper.

The next scene is in Mainwaring's Anderson shelter in his garden. He is having a restless night after eating the (rather indigestible) meal with Wilson and Jones. He takes some bismuth (indigestion) tablets and falls asleep.

The scene now shifts, and we see Mainwaring dreaming that he is Napoleon at the Battle of Waterloo. It features the rest of the cast in various roles, including Wilson as Wellington, flanked by Frazer as Gordon of the Highlanders and Hodges as a senior officer. Sponge is Marshal Ney, Walker is "Captain Gerald" in the cavalry, Jones is a French Corporal, Pike is a French drummer boy and Godfrey is a French artillery man. Many catchphrases and actions are used: "put those lights out", "you stupid drummer boy", "Godfrey's sister's upside down cakes", "Oi, Napoleon", and also some phrases from earlier in the episode, such as Sponge saying "we should have sat down the front, in the ninepennies" when Mainwaring complains that he cannot see the battle. At the surrender, Wilson acts very superior, for instance asking Mainwaring for his full name and address, and refusing to let Mainwaring borrow his pen. Mainwaring says farewell to his troops, with great comic effect. Hodges then tells the troops that the Duke will buy them all a drink, and in the stampede they knock Mainwaring over into the mud.

Mainwaring is next seen just before being exiled to Elba, standing next to the bus conductress, who is dressed as Marie Walewska. They exchange farewells, then Mainwaring wakes up to find that he has overslept and he has a rude note from his wife complaining that he didn't come home last night.

Cast

Arthur Lowe as Captain Mainwaring and Napoleon
John Le Mesurier as Sergeant Wilson and Wellington
Clive Dunn as Lance Corporal Jones and French corporal
John Laurie as Private Frazer and Gordon
James Beck as Private Walker and French cavalryman Captain Gerald
Arnold Ridley as Private Godfrey and French artilleryman
Ian Lavender as Private Pike and French drummer boy
Bill Pertwee as ARP Warden Hodges and British officer
Frank Williams as The Vicar
Robert Gillespie as Charles Boyer playing Napoleon
Joan Savage as Greta Garbo playing Marie Walewska
Joy Allen as Bus Conductress and Marie Walewska
Colin Bean as Private Sponge and Marshal Ney

Notes
The film shown in the cinema is supposed to be Conquest, which starred Charles Boyer as Napoleon and Greta Garbo as Marie Walewska.  They wanted to use a clip from the actual film, but this would have been too costly.
The episode copied some details from the feature film Waterloo (1970): the scene where Napoleon kisses the flag, and incorrectly showing Colonel Alexander Gordon, 4th Duke of Gordon as fighting at Waterloo (played by Frazer in the dream sequence).
Napoleon Bonaparte was in fact exiled to Elba before the Battle of Waterloo. After this defeat, he was imprisoned on the island of St Helena.
This episode is the closest we ever get to seeing Mrs Mainwaring, when we see her very large posterior hanging down in the upper bunk above Mainwaring in the Anderson shelter.
This is one of two episodes which rather whimsically showed the Dad's Army characters in a historical setting; the other was The Two and a Half Feathers.

References

Further reading

External links

Dad's Army (series 5) episodes
1972 British television episodes
Depictions of Napoleon on film
Cultural depictions of Arthur Wellesley, 1st Duke of Wellington
Cultural depictions of Greta Garbo
Works about the Battle of Waterloo